One who is jealous is experiencing jealousy.

Jealous may also refer to:

Music

Albums
 Jealous (album), by John Lee Hooker, 1986

Songs
 "Jealous" (Beyoncé song), 2013
 "Jealous" (Eyedress song), 2019
 "Jealous" (Labrinth song), 2014
 "Jealous" (Nick Jonas song), 2014
 "Jealous" (Nina Girado song), 2002
 "Jealous" (Sinéad O'Connor song), 2000
 "Jealous" (TVXQ song), 2018
 "Jealous (I Ain't with It)", by Chromeo, 2014
 "Jealous", by AlunaGeorge from I Remember, 2016
 "Jealous", by Dir En Grey, 1998
 "Jealous", by DJ Khaled from Father of Asahd, 2019
 "Jealous", by Fredo Santana from Trappin Ain't Dead, 2013
 "Jealous", by Gene Loves Jezebel, 1990
 "Jealous", by Ingrid Michaelson from Stranger Songs, 2019
 "Jealous", by Jack Little
 "Jealous", by Jessica Mauboy from Hilda, 2019
 "Jealous", by Lennon Stella from Three. Two. One., 2020
 "Jealous", by Mahalia featuring Rico Nasty, 2021
 "Jealous", by Ne-Yo from R.E.D., 2012
 "Jealous", by Rod Stewart from Tonight I'm Yours, 1981

Other uses
 Ben Jealous (born 1973), American civic leader and politician

See also
 Jealousy (disambiguation)
 I'm Jealous (disambiguation)